The York gas field is a natural gas reservoir and production facility in the UK sector of the southern North Sea, about 34 km of east of the Yorkshire coast. It has been in production since March 2013.

The field 
The York field extends over UK Blocks 47/2a, 47/3a, 47/3d and 47/3e. The field was discovered in 1993 by well 47/02-1 drilled by the Noble Julie Robinson. The reservoir has reserves of 106 billion cubic feet or 3 billion cubic metres.

Centrica owned and developed the York gas field, now owned and operated by Spirit Energy.

Development 
Production from the field was developed by a single offshore platform. Details of the platform are as shown.

In addition to the York offshore facilities a new gas process facility was constructed at the Easington terminal to receive and treat the gas prior to shipment into the National Transmission System.

The production profile (in million standard cubic feet) of gas from the York field was as shown.
In 2019 the York pipeline was routed to the Dimlington terminal to access low pressure compression, thereby extending the field life.

See also 

 Easington gas terminal
 List of oil and gas fields of the North Sea

References 

Natural gas fields in the United Kingdom
North Sea energy